Adolphe Chenevière, D.ès.L. (1855–1917) was a fin de siècle Swiss novelist, short story writer, and literary scholar.

Life 
Adolphe Chenevière was born to Arthur Chenevière (a state counsellor for the canton of Geneva) and Susanne Firmine (née Munier). He earned a doctorate from the University of Paris; his thesis, Bonaventure Des Périers, sa vie, sa poésie, examined the life and poetic works of the 16th-century author Bonaventure des Périers. E. Plon published the thesis in 1885. Having completed his studies, Chenevière married Blanche Ernestine Augustine Lugol.

In 1886, Plon published De Plutarchi Familiaribus, Chenevière's Latin dissertation on Plutarch. Meanwhile, Chenevière and his wife had their first son, Jacques Chenevière, who was born in Paris. In 1888, their second son, André Alfred, was born, but he did not survive infancy; Chenevière's mother, too, died that year.

From the late 1880s through the end of the century, he wrote a steady series of novels, including various romances published by Alphonse Lemerre. One of his stories, "Tonton", was translated into English and included in the third volume of the International Short Stories series published by P.F. Collier & Son in 1910. 

During the First World War, Chenevière voluntereered at the International Prisoners-of-War Agency (IPWA) of the International Committee of the Red Cross (ICRC) like his son Jacques, who went on to become both a celebrated writer and a high-ranking member of the ICRC himself.

Stratford Magazine republished this translation in their September 1927 issue, ten years after Chenevière's death.

Novels

References

External links
 
  
 

1855 births
1917 deaths
19th-century Swiss novelists
Chevaliers of the Légion d'honneur
Swiss male novelists
Swiss male short story writers
Swiss short story writers
University of Paris alumni
19th-century short story writers
19th-century male writers
Swiss expatriates in France